Mordellistena erythroderes is a beetle in the genus Mordellistena of the family Mordellidae. It was described in 1922 by Hill.

References

erythroderes
Beetles described in 1922